Norman Kershaw Cox (1 December 1869 – 28 December 1949) was a New Zealand dentist and dental health reformer. He was born in Preston, Lancashire, England on 1 December 1869.

References

1869 births
1949 deaths
English emigrants to New Zealand
New Zealand dentists